Bythiospeum elseri is a species of very small freshwater snails that have an operculum, aquatic gastropod mollusks in the family Hydrobiidae.

This species is endemic to Austria.

References

Hydrobiidae
Bythiospeum
Endemic fauna of Austria
Gastropods described in 1929
Taxonomy articles created by Polbot